The Dean of Lichfield is the head (primus inter pares – first among equals) and chair of the chapter of canons, the ruling body of Lichfield Cathedral. The dean and chapter are based at the Cathedral Church of the Blessed Virgin Mary and St Chad in Lichfield. The cathedral is the mother church of the Diocese of Lichfield and seat of the Bishop of Lichfield. The current dean is Adrian Dorber.

List of deans

Early Medieval
1222–1254 William de Manecestra
1254–? Ralph de Sempringham

Medieval
1280–1319 John de Derby
1319–1324 Stephen Seagrave  (afterwards Archbishop of Armagh)
1324–1328 Roger de Convenis
1328–1335 John Garssia  (afterwards Bishop of Marseille)
1335–1346 Richard FitzRalph
1346–1347 John of Thoresby
1347–1349 Simon de Brisele  (afterwards Dean of Lincoln)
1350–1363 John Bokyngham
1364–1369 William de Manton
1369–? Laurence de Ibstock
?–1370 Anthony Rous
1371–1378 Francis de Teobaldeschi
1381–1390 William Pakington
1390–1426 Thomas de Stretton
1426–1432 Robert Wolveden
1432–1447 John Verney (probably Archdeacon of Worcester, 1438–1452), formerly Rector of Bredon in Worcestershire, and supervisor and receiver-general to Richard Beauchamp, 13th Earl of Warwick (1382-1439). He was the younger brother of Sir Richard de Verney (d.1489) of Compton Verney in Warwickshire.
1457–1492 Thomas Heywood

Early modern
1493–1512 John Yotton
1512–1521 Ralph Colyngwood
1522–1533 James Denton
1533–1536 Richard Sampson
1536–1554 Henry Williams
1554–1559 John Ramridge (deprived)
1560–1576 Laurence Nowell
1576–1603 George Boleyn
July 1603–20 December 1604 (res.) James Montague (became Dean of Worcester)
1605–1622 William Tooker
1622–1628 Walter Curle
1628–1632 Augustine Lindsell
1633–1638 John Warner
1638–1638 Samuel Fell
1638–1659 Griffin Higgs
1661–1663 William Paul
1664–1671 Thomas Wood
1671–1683 Matthew Smallwood
1683–1703 Lancelot Addison
1703–1712 William Binckes
1713–1720 Jonathan Kimberley
1720–1730 William Walmesley
1730–1745 Nicholas Penny
1745–1776 John Addenbrooke
1776–1807 Baptist Proby

Late modern
1807–1833 John Woodhouse
1833–1868 Henry Howard
1868–1875 William Champneys
1875–1892 Edward Bickersteth
1892–1909 Herbert Luckock
1909–1939 Henry Savage
1939–1952 Frederic Iremonger
1954–1969 William MacPherson
1970–1979 George Holderness
1980–1993 John Lang
1994–1999 Tom Wright
1999–2005 Michael Yorke
2005–present Adrian Dorber
March–September 2012 Pete Wilcox, Acting Dean

Notes

Deans of Lichfield
 
Dean of Lichfield